Plum Spooky (2009) is a novel by Janet Evanovich starring the fictional character Stephanie Plum. It is one of the four holiday novellas in the series (now referred to by the publisher as "Between-the-Numbers Novels") that star the bounty hunter.

References 

2009 American novels
Stephanie Plum books
American novellas